Dennis Enarson (born April 19, 1991 in La Mesa, California) is a professional BMX rider who has won 10 X Games medals and Dew Tour Dirt Jumping & Park events. He is known as one of the best riders in freestyle for his cannonball barspins and ability to adapt to any street, park or dirt course. He is currently residing in San Diego, California and trains with Coach John Welch at NAKOA Fitness.

Enarson began racing BMX at age 8 but decided to quit to begin riding streets and skate parks because he enjoyed it more. He designed the BMX Park course at the 2011 Dew Tour in Portland, OR. He has his own signature frame with Haro Bikes called the SD and a full range of signature BMX parts with Demolition parts, called 'The Rig' line.

Unclicked Podcast
In 2019 Enarson started his own podcast named 'Unclicked', ran out of his San Diego home. He interviews fellow BMX professionals and industry personalities, and releases episodes each Monday via Spotify and Buzzsprout.
In 2020 Dennis started working with Ryan Fudger from 'our bmx' to continuous making podcasts.

References

External links
 Haro Bikes website
 

1991 births
Living people
American male cyclists
X Games athletes
People from La Mesa, California